Six Mile Creek or Sixmile Creek may refer to several places:

United States 

 Sixmile Creek (Alaska)
 Six Mile Creek (Minnesota),
 Sixmile Creek (South Dakota)
 Six Mile Creek (Ithaca)

Elsewhere 
Six Mile Creek Dam, Australia

See also
Six Mile Run (disambiguation)
Six Mile (disambiguation)